1988–89 Svenska Cupen was the 34th season of the main Swedish football Cup. The competition started in 1988 and concluded in 1989 with the Final, held at Råsunda Stadium, Solna. Malmö FF won the final 3–0 against Djurgårdens IF.

References

External links
1989 Swedish national cup final game at SVT's open archive 

Svenska Cupen seasons
Cupen
Cupen
Sweden